Forgotten Worlds, titled  in Japan, is a side-scrolling shooter video game by Capcom, originally released as a coin-operated arcade game in 1988. It is notable for being the first title released by Capcom for their CP System arcade game hardware.

Plot
Set in the 29th century, an evil god known as Bios has destroyed most of the Earth, turning it into a desolate wasteland known as the Dust World. Two nameless supersoldiers are created by the people to defeat Bios and the eight evil gods who serve him.

Gameplay
Forgotten Worlds can be played by up to two players simultaneously. The player controls a flying muscle-bound soldier armed with a rifle with unlimited ammo. The Player 1 character is equipped with a long-range automatic rifle, while Player 2 has a short-range wide shot. The controls in the original coin-op version consist of an eight-way joystick for moving the character in the air while flying and a unique rotatable button known as the "roll switch". Rotating the switch left or right allows the player to adjust their character's aim in one of sixteen directions, while pressing it causes the player character to shoot his gun. This allows for the player to move their character anywhere while keeping their aim in one direction. Pressing the switch rapidly will cause the character to perform a "megacrush" attack which will destroy all on-screen enemies, but at the expense of a portion of their vitality gauge.

The player character is accompanied by a satellite module orbiting near him that will provide backup firepower every time the player fires their gun. Like the main character, the satellite can also be rotated with the roll switch. Rotating the character while firing will only rotate the aim of the satellite, while rotating the character without firing will not only rotate the satellite's aim, it will also move its relative position around the player.

The player can obtain blue-colored coins known as Zenny from defeating enemies throughout the game. Zenny is used as currency to obtain new power-up items from shops located at certain points in each stage. When the player enters an item shop, they are given a choice of the items available and a limited time to make any purchase they wish. These items consist primarily of new weapons for the satellite module, but also include a health kit to restore lost vitality, armor that allows the player to sustain additional damage, and even tips on how to defeat the boss awaiting at the end of the current stage.

Forgotten Worlds consists of nine stages each with its own boss. The player will lose if their vitality gauge runs out, but will be given a chance to continue.

Development
The game started off as a regular side-scrolling shooter, but Yoshiki Okamoto wanted a more imaginative game. During development, Capcom tried to make the game easier to play, having received criticism about how hard it was to dodge enemy projectiles in previous games. As this was the first game to use the CPS-1, Capcom tried to fully maximize its software capabilities. The game did not generate enough income upon its release due to large numbers of shooter games in the market and there were increased expenses due to a shortage of chips needed for the CPS-1 boards.

Home versions
Forgotten Worlds was first ported to various home computers in Europe by U.S. Gold in 1989. Versions were produced for the Amiga, Atari ST, Commodore 64, ZX Spectrum, Amstrad CPC, TurboGrafx-16 and IBM-compatible PC. These versions of the game were developed by Arc Developments. The development team had four months to make the conversions. Every graphical frame was digitised directly from the arcade version's screen using a DigiView Gold device and stored the data on an Amiga 500 computer. The God of War was hand sketched, redrawn on the computer and colored with Deluxe Paint, although the mirroring function saved time. Even the shop scene was hand sketched from scratch.

All the computer versions required a joystick controller in order to be played and could not be played with the keyboard only (with the exception of the IBM PC version, ZX Spectrum, and Amstrad CPC versions). The player rotated the character in these versions by holding the fire button while pushing the joystick left or right. In the Spectrum sales charts, it was number two, behind Robocop, which was number one every month for most of the year.

A Sega Mega Drive/Genesis version, produced by Sega, was released in Japan on November 18, 1989, with subsequent releases in North America and the PAL region in 1990. The Mega Drive version simulated the controls of the arcade version by using A and C buttons to rotate the character in either direction and the B button for shooting. Unlike in the arcade version, both players are equipped with long-ranged automatic rifles. This version has only seven of the arcade's nine stages and provides an auto-fire feature that can be toggled on or off on the game's settings. In 2008, the Mega Drive version was released on the Wii Virtual Console in North America on November 17 and in Europe on November 28.

A Master System version was also released by Sega in Europe and Brazil. This version is 1-player only and due to the presence of only two buttons on the Master System's standard controller, the buttons are used solely to rotate the character, who shoots automatically. The Megacrush attack is performed in this version by pressing both buttons simultaneously.
 
The Turbografx-16 version, produced by NEC Avenue was released in Japan on March 27, 1992. It was released as a Super CD-ROM² title which supported a specialized 3-button controller that NEC released only in Japan. An American version for the TurboGrafx 16 was released by Turbo Technologies Inc. as well. With the 3-button controller, the player can control their character as they would in the Mega Drive version, with two buttons to rotate the character and one to shoot. With the standard TurboGrafx-16 controller, the Run button is used in the place of the third button to rotate the character to the left. The TurboGrafx-16 is one-player only, but allows the player to select between either of the two Unknown Soldiers at the start of the game (with their respective abilities from the arcade version retained).

A version for the Capcom Power System Changer was planned and previewed but never released.

An emulation of the original arcade version is included in the 2005 compilation Capcom Classics Collection Vol.1 for the PlayStation 2 and Xbox,  2006s Capcom Classics Collection: Remixed for the PlayStation Portable, and also in the Nintendo Switch and Capcom Arcade Stadium. The PS2 and Xbox version, allows the player to use their respective controllers' right analog sticks to control the player character's aim. In 2008 the Sega Mega Drive/Genesis version was ported to the Wii console.

Reception

In Japan, Game Machine listed Forgotten Worlds on their September 1, 1988 issue as being the second most-successful table arcade unit of the month, outperforming titles like Sky Soldiers and Ninja Spirit.

The game was met with highly positive reviews from critics. Upon release, the arcade game received positive reviews from Computer and Video Games, The Games Machine, Your Sinclair, and Commodore User. Critics compared the arcade game favorably to earlier shooters including Capcom's Side Arms (1986), Konami's Nemesis (Gradius) and Sega's Space Harrier.

The Games Machine gave the Amiga version a score of 94%, praising the title's graphics and faithfulness to the arcade version.

Accolades
At the 1988 Gamest Awards in Japan, the arcade game received the "Best Graphics" award.

The home computer conversions received the "CVG Hit!" award from Computer + Video Games. The ZX Spectrum version received the "Crash Smash!" from Crash and the "SU Classic" award from Sinclair User.

Retrospective

Notes

References

External links

1988 video games
Amiga games
Amstrad CPC games
Arc Developments games
Arcade video games
Atari ST games
Cancelled Capcom Power System Changer games
Capcom games
Commodore 64 games
CP System games
Horizontally scrolling shooters
Master System games
Multiplayer and single-player video games
Sanritsu Denki games
Sega Genesis games
TurboGrafx-CD games
U.S. Gold games
Video games developed in Japan
Video games scored by Mark Cooksey
Video games scored by Tamayo Kawamoto
Virtual Console games
ZX Spectrum games